The 1908 Ohio Northern football team represented Ohio Northern University during the 1908 college football season.  Ohio Northern set a school record in wins with their 9–1 record, which would not be broken until the 1999 team's 11–2 record.  They also outscored their opponents by a total of 211 to 83, the majority of those 83 points coming in Ohio Northern's only loss, a 4–58 thumping by Notre Dame.

Schedule

References

Ohio Northern
Ohio Northern Polar Bears football seasons
Ohio Northern football